Möldre may refer to several places in Estonia:
Möldre, Valga County, village in Estonia
Möldre, Võru County, village in Estonia